John All Barham (July 17, 1843 – January 22, 1926) was an American lawyer and politician who served three terms as a U.S. Representative from California from 1895 to 1901.

Biography 
Barham was born on a farm in Cass County, Missouri on July 17, 1843. He moved to California with his parents in 1849 during the California Gold Rush, ending up settling in Woodland, where he attended the common schools and Hesperian College. Between 1864 and 1876, Barham taught in public schools. He studied law and was admitted to the bar in 1865, commencing practice in Watsonville, San Francisco, and Santa Rosa.

Congress 
Barham was elected as a Republican to the Fifty-fourth, Fifty-fifth, and Fifty-sixth Congresses, running from March 4, 1895, to March 3, 1901. He also served as chairman of the Committee on Mileage during the Fifty-fifth and the Fifty-sixth Congresses, but he was not a candidate for renomination in 1900.

Later career and death 
He continued working in the practice of law until his death, which took place in Santa Rosa, on January 22, 1926. He was buried in Santa Rosa Rural Cemetery.

References

1843 births
1926 deaths
Republican Party members of the United States House of Representatives from California